Lewis H. Moore (born December 22, 1958) is an American politician in the U.S. state of Oklahoma. Moore served in the  Oklahoma House of Representatives from 2009 to 2020.

Political career
In the legislative session of his first term as a lawmaker in 2009, Moore was the primary author of a total of 14 bills. Of those, one passed in the House but died in committee in the state Senate; a second bill was approved by both chambers but was vetoed by Governor Brad Henry.

On March 16, 2010, Moore admitted in a statement to moving a portrait of President Barack Obama and replacing it with Gov. Brad Henry's portrait because he was angry over the President's attempt to overhaul the nation's health care system. He apologized and said he was not trying to be disrespectful of the office of the President.

In 2013, Moore became chairman of a committee created to look at state sovereignty issues.

Moore introduced a bill to address the workers' compensation system during the 2013 legislative session.

Personal life
Moore is a military veteran and attends Faith Bible Church. He lives in Edmond with his wife Patti and four children: Hansen, Michah, Nathan and Jackson.

Election history

References

External links
 Oklahoma House of Representatives Membership Directory
 Edmond, Okla., GOP lawmaker admits Obama picture swap

Republican Party members of the Oklahoma House of Representatives
Living people
1958 births
21st-century American politicians